Narvalo was one of five s built for the  (Royal Italian Navy) during the early 1900s. The boat served in World War I with defensive purposes and was demolished in 1918.

Design
The  of small submarines, designed by Cesare Laurenti, was the first class of submarines to be built for the Italian Navy, following the 1890 experimental submarine . The submarines of the class displaced  on the surface and  submerged.

Narvalo was armed with two 450 mm (17.7 in) torpedo tubes. The submarine's crew was 2 officers and 13 other ranks.

Construction and career
Narvalo, was laid down on 9 February 1905 and launched on 21 October 1906 at the Regio Arsenale (Navy shipyard)at Venice. She was completed on 16 May 1907, as a training ship in the Adriatic Sea.

With the start of the First World War for Italy the submarine was stationed at Brindisi and placed within the IV Submarine Squadron, with Lieutenant Ottavio Siccoli as commander. It was used in a defensive function.

In 1918 the ship was transferred to Porto Corsini and later, with the end of the war, went into reserve and was demolished.

Throughout the war, the Narvalo had carried out a total of 65 defensive ambush missions a short distance from the coast, for a total of 436 hours of surface navigation and 268 diving.

References

Bibliography

External links
 Narvalo (1906) Marina Militare website

1906 ships
World War I submarines of Italy
Ships built by Venetian Arsenal
Glauco-class submarines (1905)